Club Deportivo Estibadores Navales was an Ecuadorian football club based in Manta. Founded in 1962, In 1963, it became the first club from Manabí  to play in the Serie A. While in their second season in the league in 1968, the club dissolved amidst economic reasons in 1970.

References

Defunct football clubs in Ecuador
Association football clubs disestablished in 1970
1962 establishments in Ecuador
1970 disestablishments in Ecuador